Baron Carl Johan Louis De Geer af Finspång (born 13 July 1938) is a Swedish artist, writer, musician and friherre (baron) of the De Geer noble family.

De Geer was born in Montreal, Quebec, Canada. He grew up in a castle in Skåne, in southern Sweden. He broke with his bourgeois background and became a leftist artist, and studied at Konstfack, University College of Art, Crafts and Design in Stockholm. He also exposed his grandmother's Nazi sympathies in a film called  ("Grandmother, Hitler and I").

Most radical and provoking at that time was his 1967 painting of a burning Swedish flag with the words  ('COCK') and "" (Desecrate the flag) written on it. The painting was shown in an art gallery, but was immediately confiscated by the police. During the late 1960s he was among the contributors of a satirical magazine, Puss, in Stockholm. De Geer has written a number of books and was also a member of the Swedish radical prog band Blå Tåget. He has been married to the artist Marianne Lindberg de Geer since 1987.

He was awarded the Illis quorum by the Swedish government in 2017.

References

External links

Marianne Lindberg de Geer's website
 Sinziana Ravini: Marianne Lindberg De Geer och kritiken (Dunkers kulturhus, 2010)

1938 births
Barons of Sweden
Artists from Montreal
Swedish artists
Swedish male writers
Swedish nobility
Konstfack alumni
Living people
Writers from Montreal
Swedish people of Belgian descent
Carl Johan
Recipients of the Illis quorum